A green vehicle,  clean vehicle,  eco-friendly vehicle or environmentally friendly vehicle is a road motor vehicle that produces less harmful impacts to the environment than comparable conventional internal combustion engine vehicles running on gasoline or diesel, or one that uses certain alternative fuels.  Presently, in some countries the term is used for any vehicle complying or surpassing the more stringent European emission standards (such as Euro6), or California's zero-emissions vehicle standards (such as ZEV, ULEV, SULEV, PZEV), or the low-carbon fuel standards enacted in several countries.

Green vehicles can be powered by alternative fuels and advanced vehicle technologies and include hybrid electric vehicles, plug-in hybrid electric vehicles, battery electric vehicles, compressed-air vehicles, hydrogen and fuel-cell vehicles, neat ethanol vehicles, flexible-fuel vehicles, natural gas vehicles, clean diesel vehicles, and some sources also include vehicles using blends of biodiesel and ethanol fuel or gasohol. In 2021, with an EPA-rated fuel economy of 142 miles per gallon gasoline equivalent (mpg-e), the 2021 Tesla Model 3 Standard Range Plus RWD became the most efficient EPA-certified vehicle considering all fuels and all years, surpassing the 2020 Tesla Model 3 Standard Range Plus and 2019 Hyundai Ioniq Electric.

Several authors also include conventional motor vehicles with high fuel economy, as they consider that increasing fuel economy is the most cost-effective way to improve energy efficiency and reduce carbon emissions in the transport sector in the short run. As part of their contribution to sustainable transport, these vehicles reduce air pollution and greenhouse gas emissions, and contribute to energy independence by reducing oil imports.

An environmental analysis extends beyond just the operating efficiency and emissions.  A life-cycle assessment involves production and post-use considerations.  A cradle-to-cradle design is more important than a focus on a single factor such as energy efficiency.

Energy efficiency

Cars with similar production of energy costs can obtain, during the life of the car (operational phase), large reductions in energy costs through several measures:

 The most significant is by using alternative propulsion:
 An efficient engine that reduces the vehicle's consumption of petroleum (i.e. petroleum electric hybrid vehicle), or that uses renewable energy sources throughout its working life.
 Using biofuels instead of petroleum fuels.
 Proper maintenance of a vehicle such as engine tune-ups, oil changes, and maintaining proper tire pressure can also help.
 Removing unnecessary items from a vehicle reduces weight and improves fuel economy as well.

Types

Green vehicles include vehicles types that function fully or partly on alternative energy sources other than fossil fuel or less carbon-intensive than gasoline or diesel.

Another option is the use of alternative fuel composition in conventional fossil fuel-based vehicles, making them function partially on renewable energy sources. Other approaches include personal rapid transit, a public transportation concept that offers automated, on-demand, non-stop transportation on a network of specially built guideways.

Electric and fuel cell-powered

Examples of vehicles with reduced petroleum consumption include electric cars, plug-in hybrids and fuel cell-powered hydrogen cars.

Electric cars are typically more efficient than fuel cell-powered vehicles on a Tank-to-wheel basis. They have better fuel economy than conventional internal combustion engine vehicles but are hampered by range or maximum distance attainable before discharging the battery. The electric car batteries are their main cost. They provide a 0% to 99.9% reduction in CO2 emissions compared to an ICE (gasoline, diesel) vehicle, depending on the source of electricity.

Hybrid electric vehicles

Hybrid cars may be partly fossil fuel (or biofuel) powered and partly electric or hydrogen-powered. Most combine an internal combustion engine with an electric engine, though other variations too exist. The internal combustion engine is often either a gasoline or Diesel engine (in rare cases a Stirling engine may even be used). They are more expensive to purchase but cost redemption is achieved in a period of about 5 years due to better fuel economy.

Compressed air cars, stirling vehicles, and others

Compressed air cars, stirrling-powered vehicles, and Liquid nitrogen vehicles are less polluting than an electrical vehicles, since the vehicle and its components are environment friendly. However, compressed air vehicles are far beneficial to the environment than vehicles that are considered "eco-friendly". Take the Toyota Prius, although it is marketed as an eco-friendly vehicle, it has an environmentally harmful production process. In the words of Jeremy Clarkson, a renown British car show host and expert, "The recent study found that in the long term it does more environmental damage than a Land Rover Discovery". Alternatively, compressed air vehicles are less environmentally harmful due to their air engine, which allows the car to run on compressed air instead of fuel. The engine is pumped by air instead of gasoline explosions, thus having zero emission motors, no pollution or oil.

Solar car races are held on a regular basis in order to promote green vehicles and other "green technology". These sleek driver-only vehicles can travel long distances at highway speeds using only the electricity generated instantaneously from the sun.

Improving conventional cars

A conventional vehicle can become a greener vehicle by mixing in renewable fuels or using less carbon intensive fossil fuel. Typical gasoline-powered cars can tolerate up to 10% ethanol. Brazil manufactured cars that run on neat ethanol, though there were discontinued. Another available option is a flexible-fuel vehicle which allows any blend of gasoline and ethanol, up to 85% in North America and Europe, and up to 100% in Brazil. Another existing option is to convert a conventional gasoline-powered to allow the alternative use of CNG. Pakistan, Argentina, Brazil, Iran, India, Italy, and China have the largest fleets of natural gas vehicles in the world.

Diesel-powered vehicles can often transition completely to biodiesel, though the fuel is a very strong solvent, which can occasionally damage rubber seals in vehicles built before 1994. More commonly, however, biodiesel causes problems simply because it removes all of the built-up residue in an engine, clogging filters, unless care is taken when switching from dirty fossil-fuel derived diesel to bio-diesel. It is very effective at 'de-coking' the diesel engines combustion chambers and keeping them clean. Biodiesel is the lowest emission fuel available for diesel engines. Diesel engines are the most efficient car internal combustion engines. Biodiesel is the only fuel allowed in some North American national parks because spillages will completely bio-degrade within 21 days. Biodiesel and vegetable oil fuelled, diesel engined vehicles have been declared amongst the greenest in the US Tour de Sol competition.

This presents problems, as biofuels can use food resources in order to provide mechanical energy for vehicles. Many experts point to this as a reason for growing food prices, particularly US Bio-ethanol fuel production which has affected maize prices. In order to have a low environmental impact, biofuels should be made only from waste products, or from new sources like algae.

Electric Motor and Pedal Powered Vehicles
Multiple companies are offering and developing two, three, and four wheel vehicles combining the characteristics of a bicycle with electric motors. US Federal, State and Local laws do not clearly nor consistently classify these vehicles as bicycles, electric bicycles, motorcycles, electric motorcycles, mopeds, Neighborhood Electric Vehicle, motorised quadricycle or as a car. Some laws have limits on top speeds, power of the motors, range, etc. while others do not.

Other

 Public transportation vehicles are not usually included in the green vehicle category, but Personal rapid transit (PRT) vehicles probably should be. All vehicles that are powered from the track have the advantage of potentially being able to use any source of electric energy, including sustainable ones, rather than requiring liquid fuels. They can also switch regenerative braking energy between vehicles and the electric grid rather than requiring energy storage on the vehicles. Also, they can potentially use the entire track area for solar collectors, not just the vehicle surface. The potential PRT energy efficiency is much higher than that which traditional automobiles can attain.
 Solar vehicles are electric vehicles powered by solar energy obtained from solar panels on the surface (generally, the roof) of the vehicle. Photovoltaic (PV) cells convert the Sun's energy directly into electrical energy. Solar vehicles are not practical day-to-day transportation devices at present, but are primarily demonstration vehicles and engineering exercises, often sponsored by government agencies. However, some cities have begun offering solar-powered buses, including the Tindo in Adelaide, Australia.
 Wind-powered electric vehicles primarily use wind-turbines installed at a strategic point of the vehicle, which are then converted into electric energy which causes the vehicle to propel.

Animal powered vehicles
Horse and carriage are just one type of animal propelled vehicle. Once a common form of transportation, they became far less common as cities grew and automobiles took their place. In dense cities, the waste produced by large numbers of transportation animals was a significant health problem. Oftentimes the food is produced for them using diesel powered tractors, and thus there is some environmental impact as a result of their use.

Human powered vehicles

Human-powered transport includes walking, bicycles, velomobiles, row boats, and other environmentally friendly ways of getting around. In addition to the health benefits of the exercise provided, they are far more environmentally friendly than most other options. The only downside is the speed limitations, and how far one can travel before getting exhausted.

Benefits of green vehicle use

Environmental
Vehicle emissions contribute to the increasing concentration of gases linked to climate change.  In order of significance, the principal greenhouse gases associated with road transport are carbon dioxide (CO2), methane (CH4) and nitrous oxide (N2O). Road transport is the third largest source of greenhouse gases emitted in the UK, and accounts for about 27% of total emissions, and 33% in the United States.  Of the total greenhouse gas emissions from transport, over 85% are due to CO2 emissions from road vehicles. The transport sector is the fastest growing source of greenhouse gases.

Health
Vehicle pollutants have been linked to human ill health including the incidence of respiratory and cardiopulmonary disease and lung cancer. A 1998 report estimated that up to 24,000 people die prematurely each year in the UK as a direct result of air pollution.  According to the World Health Organization, up to 13,000 deaths per year among children (aged 0–4 years) across Europe are directly attributable to outdoor pollution. The organization estimates that if pollution levels were returned to within EU limits, more than 5,000 of these lives could be saved each year.

Monetary
Hybrid taxi fleet operators in New York have also reported that reduced fuel consumption saves them thousands of dollars per year.

Criticism
A study by CNW Marketing Research suggested that the extra energy cost of manufacture, shipping, disposal, and the short lives of some of these types of vehicle (particularly gas-electric hybrid vehicles) outweighs any energy savings made by their using less petroleum during their useful lifespan.  This type of argument is the long smokestack argument.  Critics of the report note that the study prorated all of Toyota's hybrid research-and-development costs across the relatively small number of Priuses on the road, rather than using the incremental cost of building a vehicle; used for the length of life of a Prius (Toyota offers a  warranty on the Prius' hybrid components, including the battery), and calculated that a majority of a car's cradle-to-grave energy gets expended during the vehicle's production, not while it is driven.
Norwegian Consumer Ombudsman official Bente Øverli stated that "Cars cannot do anything good for the environment except less damage than others." Based on this opinion, Norwegian law severely restricts the use of "greenwashing" to market automobiles, strongly prohibiting advertising a vehicle as being environmentally friendly, with large fines issued to violators.

Some studies try to compare environmental impact of electric and petrol vehicles over complete life cycle, including production, operation, and dismantling. 

In general, results differ vastly dependent on the region considered, due to difference in energy sources to produce electricity that fuels electric vehicles. When considering only CO2 emissions, it is noted that production of electric cars generate about twice as much emissions as that of internal combustion cars. However, emissions of CO2 during operation are much larger (on average) than during production. For electric cars, emissions caused during operation depend on energy sources used to produce electricity and thus vary a lot geographically. Studies suggest that when taking into account both production and operation, electric cars would cause more emissions in economies where production of electricity is not clean, e.g., it is mostly coal based. For this reason, some studies found that driving electric cars is less environmentally damaging in western US states than in eastern ones, where less electricity is produced using cleaner sources. Similarly, in countries like India, Australia or China, where large portion of electricity is produced by using coal, driving electric vehicles would cause larger environmental damage than driving petrol vehicles. When justifying use of electric cars over petrol cars, these kinds of studies do not provide sufficiently clear results. Environmental impact is calculated based on fuel mix used to produce electricity that powers electric cars. However, when a gas vehicle is replaced by an equivalent electric vehicle, additional power must be installed in electrical grid. This additional capacity would normally not be based on the same ratios of energy sources ("clean" versus fossil fuels) than the current capacity. Only when additional electricity production capacity installed to switch from petrol to electric vehicles would predominantly consist of clean sources, switch to electric vehicles could reduce environmental damage. Another common problem in methodology used in comparative studies is that it only focuses on specific kinds of environmental impact. While some studies focus only on emission of gas pollutants over life cycle or only on greenhouse gas emissions such as CO2, comparison should also account for other environmental impacts such as pollutants released otherwise during production and operation or ingredients that can not be effectively recycled. Examples include use of lighter high performing metals, lithium batteries and more rare metals in electric cars, which all have high environmental impact.

A study that also looked at factors other than energy consumption and carbon emissions has suggested that there is no such thing as an environmentally friendly car.

The use of vehicles with increased fuel efficiency is usually considered positive in the short term but criticism of any hydrocarbon-based personal transport remains.  The Jevons paradox suggests that energy efficiency programs are often counter-productive, even increasing energy consumption in the long run. Many environmental researchers believe that sustainable transport may require a move away from hydrocarbon fuels and from our present automobile and highway paradigm.

National and international promotion

European Union
The European Union is promoting the marketing of greener cars via a combination of binding and non-binding measures. As of April 2010, 15 of the 27 member states of the European Union provide tax incentives for electrically chargeable vehicles and some alternative fuel vehicles, which includes all Western European countries except Italy and Luxembourg, plus the Czech Republic and Romania. The incentives consist of tax reductions and exemptions, as well as of bonus payments for buyers of electric cars, plug-in hybrids, hybrid electric vehicles and natural gas vehicles.

United States
The United States Environmental Protection Agency (EPA) is promoting the marketing of greener cars via the SmartWay program. The SmartWay and SmartWay Elite designation mean that a vehicle is a better environmental performer relative to other vehicles. This US EPA designation is arrived at by taking into account a vehicle's Air Pollution Score and Greenhouse Gas Score. Higher Air Pollution Scores indicate vehicles that emit lower amounts of pollutants that cause smog relative to other vehicles. Higher Greenhouse Gas Scores indicate vehicles that emit lower amounts of carbon dioxide and have improved fuel economy relative to other vehicles.

To earn the SmartWay designation, a vehicle must earn at least a 6 on the Air Pollution Score and at least a 6 on the Greenhouse Gas Score, but have a combined score of at least 13. SmartWay Elite is given to those vehicles that score 9 or better on both the Greenhouse Gas and Air Pollution Scores.

A Green Vehicle Marketing Alliance, in conjunction with the Oak Ridge National Laboratory (ORNL), periodically meets, and coordinates marketing efforts.

Green car rankings

Several automobile magazines, motor vehicle specialized publications and environmental groups publish annual rankings or listings of the best green cars of a given year. The following table presents a selection of the annual top pickings.

Electric vehicle motor shows

Dedicated electric and green vehicle motor shows:

 Alternative Vehicle and Fuel Show (AVFS), Fair of Valladolid, Spain, in November.
 Green Fleet Expo, Royal Botanical Gardens (Ontario), in May.
 Green-Car-Guide Live!, Arena and Convention Centre in Liverpool, in June
 Electric & Hybrid Vehicle Technology Expo, (Sindelfingen, Germany, April / Novi, Detroit, Michigan, September).  
 European Electric Motor Show, Helsinki Exhibition & Convention Centre, in November

See also

 Alternative fuel vehicle
 Alternatives to the automobile
 Better Place
 Emerging technologies - e.g. new green vehicle methods
 Green tuning
 Michelin Green X Challenge
 Government incentives for plug-in electric vehicles
 Hybrid taxis
 Union of Concerned Scientists' Hybrid Scorecard
 Low-carbon fuel standard
 Miles per gallon gasoline equivalent

 Motorised quadricycle
 Plug-in electric vehicles
 Progressive Insurance Automotive X Prize
 Zero-emissions vehicle

Notes and references

Further reading
 
 
 DFE2008 Automobile Engines, Wikiversity

External links

2013 VehicleTechnologies Market Report, Oak Ridge National Laboratory 
 Alternative Fuels and Advanced Vehicle Data Center
 AU Green Vehicle Guide
 Clean Car Calculator (Institute for Energy Efficiency)
 Clean Cities - 2014 Vehicle Buyer's Guide, National Renewable Energy Laboratory (NREL), U.S. Department of Energy, Clean Cities program. December 2013.
  Cradle-to-Grave Lifecycle Analysis of U.S. Light-Duty Vehicle-Fuel Pathways: A Greenhouse Gas Emissions and Economic Assessment of Current (2015) and Future (2025-2030) Technologies  (includes estimated cost of avoided GHG emissions from different AFV technologies), Argonne National Laboratory, June 2016.
 Earth cars
 EPA Green Vehicle Guide
 Green Cars (Autocar)
 Green Car Center (Yahoo)
 Green Car Guide .
 Infographic: Green Cars 101 (2011)
 Green cars and eco driving 
 Green Progress
Model Year 2014 Fuel Economy Guide , U.S. Environmental Protection Agency and U.S. Department of Energy, April 2014.
 Progressive Insurance Automotive X PRIZE homepage
 Small Efficient Vehicles Wiki: People's Car Project
 State of Charge: Electric Vehicles’ Global Warming Emissions and Fuel-Cost Savings across the United States  (UCS)
 Top Ten EPA-Rated Fuel Sippers (2016) - including BEVs and PHEVs
 UCS Hybrid Scorecard  (Union of Concerned Scientists)